Galley and Warden Hills is a 47 hectare biological Site of Special Scientific Interest in Warden Hill, a suburb of Luton in Bedfordshire. The local planning authority is Central Bedfordshire Council, and it was notified in 1986 under Section 28 of the Wildlife and Countryside Act 1981. It is also a Local Nature Reserve.

The site is chalk grassland with areas of dense scrub, and it has many plants which are rare nationally and locally. It has a wide variety of wild flowers and more than twenty species of butterflies. Near the top of Galley Hill there are two Bronze Age barrows, one of which was used for public executions in the Middle Ages.

The Icknield Way Path passes through the hills on its 110-mile course from Ivinghoe Beacon in Buckinghamshire to Knettishall Heath in Suffolk.

There is access from Warden Hill Road.

References 

Local Nature Reserves in Bedfordshire
Sites of Special Scientific Interest in Bedfordshire